Nysa was a town in ancient Naxos whose location was not otherwise known precisely.

References

Populated places in the ancient Aegean islands
Former populated places in Greece
Lost ancient cities and towns
Ancient Naxos